Kedarnath (or Kedarnath Main) and Kedarnath Dome (or Kedar Dome) are two mountains in the Gangotri Group of peaks in the western Garhwal Himalaya in Uttarakhand state, India. Kedarnath (Main) lies on the main ridge that lies south of the Gangotri Glacier, and Kedarnath Dome, a subpeak of the main peak, lies on a spur projecting towards the glacier, two kilometres northwest of Kedarnath. Kedarnath is the highest peak on the south side of the Gangotri Glacier, and Kedarnath Dome is the third highest.

Ascent
Kedarnath and Kedarnath Dome were first climbed together, in 1947, by a Swiss team led by André Roch. Their route on Kedarnath Dome, the northwest flank, is still the standard route; it is straightforward and relatively low-angle, and is a popular ski ascent in the spring season. The east face of Kedarnath Dome was first climbed in 1989 by a Hungarian expedition led by Attila Ozsváth. Their climb involved "sixty pitches of very hard climbing."

Photo gallery

See also

 List of Himalayan peaks of Uttarakhand

References

Geography of Uttarkashi district
Mountains of Uttarakhand
Six-thousanders of the Himalayas